Shyster  (also spelled schiester, scheister, shiester, etc.) is a slang word for someone who acts in a disreputable, unethical, or unscrupulous way, especially in the practice of law, sometimes also politics or economics.

Etymology
The etymology of the word is not generally agreed upon. The Oxford English Dictionary describes it as "of obscure origin", possibly deriving from a historical sense of "shy" meaning disreputable.

The Merriam-Webster Dictionary deemed it probably based on the German Scheißer (literally "shitter", i.e. "defecator"). A book published in 2013 traces the first use back to 1843, when scammers in New York City would exploit prisoners by pretending to be lawyers. These scammers were disparagingly referred to as "shisers", meaning "worthless people" in British slang, which in turn was originally derived from the German "Scheißer".

Various false etymologies have suggested an antisemitic origin, possibly associated with the character of Shylock from Shakespeare's The Merchant of Venice, but there is no clear evidence for this.  One source asserts that the term originated in Philadelphia in 1843 from a disreputable attorney named "Schuster."

The Soviet nuclear missile R-5 Pobeda ("Victory") was given the NATO reporting name "Shyster".

Cultural references
 U.S. professional wrestler Mike Rotunda, using the ring name Irwin R. Schyster (abbreviated to "I.R.S.") portrayed a dishonest tax collector and accountant.
 Sylvester Shyster, a Walt Disney cartoon character introduced in 1930, is a disbarred attorney who schemes to deprive Minnie Mouse of her inheritance; and in many comic serials by Floyd Gottfredson (his creator) he appeared scheming with Peg-leg Pete
 The 1932/33 radio show Flywheel, Shyster, and Flywheel, starring Groucho and Chico Marx, depicts the misadventures of a small law firm.
 Lionel Hutz is also an example of a lawyer who was repeatedly hired by the Simpsons, despite Marge and Lisa being aware of his reputation and calling him a "shyster". He operates out of a small law firm in a mall.
 The film Big Stan featured Lew Popper who is a shyster lawyer that Stan Minton replaces his lawyer Mal with in an attempt to bribe Judge Perry. Lew does that where Stan is allowed 3 years in Verlaine State Correctional Facility while spending 6 months before incarceration to reorganize his "charity". By the end of the film, Lew was arrested and incarcerated at Verlaine State Correctional Facility for having slept with a foreperson of a trial he was recently involved in.
 Saul Goodman (aka Jimmy McGill) is a criminal lawyer featured in Breaking Bad and is the eponymous main character of its prequel, Better Call Saul. In both shows, Saul is shown to be flagrant in his violations of the law and indifferent about scheming and committing crimes to get a better outcome for his defendants in court. Because of his disregard of the law, his fellow lawyers have called him a shyster, most notably Howard Hamlin. He becomes affiliated with the chemistry teacher-turned-drug lord, Walter White, and serves as his advisor and confidant in his highly illegal activities. 
 'The Lawyer' is a nameless recurring character in It's Always Sunny in Philadelphia who is often pitted against 'the Gang' and their friends in their numerous legal exploits. Despite his apparent legal prowess he is often described as a shyster and a 'Jew Lawyer', especially by Frank.

See also
 Hustler
 Pseudolaw

References

Confidence tricks
Pejorative terms for people